Trinity Business School, Trinity College Dublin is located on College Green, in Dublin, Ireland. Trinity Business School is triple accredited (AACSB/EQUIS/AMBA), putting it in the top 0.6% of business schools worldwide. It offers programmes at undergraduate, postgraduate, MBA and Executive Education levels. The School is ranked 1st in Ireland in the Eduniversal Dean's Rankings, 2017. In 2019 QS Rankings place Trinity Business School 1st in Ireland and 23rd in the world.

History
Established as a School of Commerce in 1925, the School has grown from offering B.A. and BComm degrees to offering an MBA programme since 1964 when it was transformed into a School of Business Studies. A full suite of Masters programmes exist today and this began in 1976 when the MSc (Mgmt) degree in Management Practice for practicing senior executives was launched, with a curriculum based on action research principles. The School is part of the Faculty of Arts, Humanities and Social Sciences of Trinity College.

High Growth Strategy: Building the Future
Trinity Business School is in the midst of a high growth strategy which was introduced in 2015. It involves the development of new and existing programmes, as well as the construction of a new building for the School which will open onto Pearse Street. The project is to be completed in May 2019. Trinity Business School is among the fastest growing established business schools in Europe.

Trinity Business School has been one of the top success stories in the Global Business School education market over the last few years.  It’s story has been featured in the publications and conferences of all the top international accreditation agencies i.e. EFMD, AACSB and AMBA.  

The School is among the fastest growing business schools in Europe with a growth rate of 127 per cent over the past three years. The new €80 million 11,400 square metre Trinity Business School building was opened in 2019 and includes an innovation and entrepreneurial hub, a 600-seat auditorium, restaurant spaces for up to 200 people, smart classrooms with the latest digital technology, and a rooftop conference room. It is a near zero energy building, with some 500sq m of photovoltaic panels installed on the roof contribute to the electrical provision of the building and offsetting 35 tonnes of carbon per annum. Water for toilets is provided by recycled rainwater.

The School has grown 150% over the last 5 years, having moved into this eco-friendly cutting edge new building, has had a surge in innovation activities across all its activates and is about to open the Republic of Ireland’s first multi-media lecture room for remote interactive learning. It is set to continue this dynamic innovative trajectory by supplementing it’s on campus degree education with additional learning options which provide flexible, blended and life–long learning for next-generation working and learning which blends the real life experience on Trinity’s stunning campus with flexible, interactive, remote learning in a multitude of formats from degree to byte sized micro credentialing life long and executive level learning.

Programmes

Trinity Business School offers programmes at undergraduate, postgraduate and MBA levels.

Undergraduate 
 Bachelor in Business Studies (B.B.S.)
 BA Moderatorship Business, Economic and Social Studies (B.E.S.S.)
 Business and Law
 Business and Languages
 Business and Computing

Postgraduate 
 MSc in Operations and Supply Chain Management
MSc in Digital Marketing Strategy
MSc in Business Analytics
MSc in Law & Finance
 MSc in Entrepreneurship
 MSc in Finance
 MSc in Financial Risk Management
 MSc in Human Resource Management
 MSc in International Management
 MSc in Management
 MSc in Marketing
 Postgraduate Diploma in Accounting
 Trinity MBA (Executive & Full-Time)
 Executive Education

Doctoral Programme

The Trinity MBA
Established in 1964, Trinity Business School's MBA is one of the three original MBA programmes in Europe. T

 The Trinity Executive MBA ranked 1st in Ireland, 4th in the UK & Ireland, 11th in Europe, 38th in the World in The Economist Executive MBA Ranking 2020.

Current Research
Researchers in Trinity Business School seek answers to managerially relevant questions that are focused on the following themes: 
 Entrepreneurship and Social Entrepreneurship 
 Marketing and Consumers
 Finance and Accounting
 Work and People
 Strategy and Change
 CSR, Governance and Business Ethics
 International Business 
 Innovation, Manufacturing and Systems
 Organizational Studies

Affiliated societies and alumni groups
 Trinity Business Alumni - The global association of graduates of Trinity College Dublin who are involved in business.
 DUBES - The Dublin University Business and Economics Society (DUBES), founded in 1929.
 Trinity Entrepreneurial Society
 Enactus - A social entrepreneurship society.
 Trinity Economic Forum -
 Trinity SMF - Trinity SMF is the Student Managed Fund.

Awards
 Trinity MBA Scholarship Fund
 Trinity Business Alumni / Bank of Ireland Business Student of the Year Award

Notable alumni
 Hoang Trung Hai, Deputy Prime Minister, Socialist Republic of Vietnam
 Michael O'Leary, CEO Ryanair
 Hugo MacNeill MD Goldman Sachs, former Irish international rugby player
 Willie Walsh, CEO International Airlines Group

References

External links
 Official Website

1962 establishments in Ireland
Buildings and structures of Trinity College Dublin
Business schools in the Republic of Ireland
Trinity College Dublin
Educational institutions established in 1962